John Govett (1832 – 7 December 1920) was a politician in Queensland, Australia. He was a Member of the Queensland Legislative Assembly, representing Mitchell from 1882 to 1888.

References

Members of the Queensland Legislative Assembly
1832 births
1920 deaths